The Men's 800 metre freestyle competition of the 2014 European Aquatics Championships was held on 21–22 August 2014.

Records
Prior to the competition, the existing world, European and championship records were as follows.

Results

Heats
The heats were held at 10.16.

Final
The final was held at 18:07.

References

Men's 800 metre freestyle
European Aquatics Championships